Savva (Savely) Vasilyevich Yamshchikov (October 8, 1938 – July 19, 2009) was a leading expert on Russian provincial art, particularly medieval icon painting and portrait painting of the 18th and 19th centuries.

Yamschikov graduated from the Moscow University and worked at the All-Russian Art Restoration Center in Moscow. He went from one province to another in order to find medieval icons that required cleansing.

Yamshchikov curated over 300 art exhibitions and first brought to light a number of provincial portraits from Yaroslavl, Rybinsk, Kostroma. It was he who rediscovered such forgotten artists as Grigory Ostrovsky, Dmitry Korenev, and Nikolay Mylnikov.  He also advised Andrei Tarkovsky on the production of Andrei Rublev and Sergey Bondarchuk on the production of Boris Godunov.

Yamshchikov spent much of his later life in Pskov, helping preserve medieval architecture of the region. He died in Pskov and was buried in Pushkinskie Gory.

Works

References

1938 births
2009 deaths
Russian art curators
Soviet art historians
Soviet male writers
20th-century Russian male writers
Russian art historians
Moscow State University alumni
20th-century Russian writers
Writers from Moscow